Ayr Ice Rink was an ice arena in Ayr, Scotland that opened in 1939 and was used for ice skating, ice hockey and curling. The rink was notable as being the home of professional ice hockey clubs Ayr Raiders and Ayr Bruins.

The building was located at 21 Beresford Terrace on the former site of Beresford Park, home of Ayr Parkhouse Football Club.  Ayr Ice Rink Ltd purchased the land from London Midland and Scottish Railway in 1938 to build the rink.

The property was demolished in 1972 to make way for a Safeway supermarket and today the site is occupied by two retail stores and carpark.

A new ice rink was built at Limekiln Road on the site of the defunct Tams Brig Stadium  and is owned by Ayr Curling Club. It is predominantly used for curling but figure skating  and recreational ice hockey.

Notes 

Indoor arenas in Scotland
Sports venues in Ayr
Event venues established in 1939
Sports venues completed in 1939
Sports venues demolished in 1972
1972 disestablishments in Scotland
1939 establishments in Scotland
Demolished sports venues in the United Kingdom
Curling venues in Scotland